Streptomyces natalensis is a bacterial species in the genus Streptomyces.

Uses 
Natamycin is an antifungal agent produced during fermentation by S. natalensis.

References

Further reading

External links 

natalensis